Dhanetha is a village situated in Samana Tehsil, Patiala District, Punjab, India.

References 

Villages in Patiala district